Khasan railway station is a railway station on the Baranovsky-Khasan railway line in the village of Khasan, Khasansky District, Primorsky Krai, Russia. It belongs to the Vladivostok branch of the Far Eastern Railway. It is the last station in Russia before the line continues into North Korea.

See also
North Korea–Russia border

References

Railway stations in Russia opened in 1951
Railway stations in Primorsky Krai